Resin birch is a common name for several plants and may refer to:

Betula glandulosa, native to North America
Betula neoalaskana, native to Alaska and northern Canada